Miandeh (also Romanized as Mīāndeh, Meyāndeh, and Mīyān Deh) is a village in Khosuyeh Rural District, in the Central District of Zarrin Dasht County, Fars Province, Iran. At the 2006 census, its population was 1,385, in 289 families.

References 

Populated places in Zarrin Dasht County